Shams ud-Din Kayumars (c. 1285 – 13 June 1290, reigned in 1290) was a son of Muiz ud-Din Qaiqabad, the eleventh sultan of the Mamluk dynasty of the Delhi Sultanate.

Life 
His father Muiz ud din Qaiqabad is said to have been murdered by a Khalji noble, Jalal ud-Din Firuz Khalji. Khalji assumed the throne after murdering Kayumars, ending the Mamluk dynasty and starting the Khalji dynasty. By that time Qaiqabad was struck down with paralysis and the Turkic nobles had raised his three-year old son Kayumars to the throne as the Sultan.

See also
Muslim history
History of India
List of Indian monarchs

References

External links
India Through the Ages
The Slave Dynasty
The Khalji Revolution

Year of birth missing
Year of death missing
Sultans of the Mamluk dynasty (Delhi)
Child monarchs from Asia
Monarchs deposed as children
13th century in India
Indian Sunni Muslims
13th-century Indian monarchs